"Under the Bridge" is a song by American rock band Red Hot Chili Peppers and the eleventh track on their fifth studio album, Blood Sugar Sex Magik (1991). Vocalist Anthony Kiedis wrote the lyrics while reflecting on loneliness and the struggles of being clean from drugs, and almost did not share it with the band. Released in March 1992, "Under the Bridge" was praised by critics and fans for its emotional weight. The song was a commercial success and the band's highest-charting single, peaking at number 2 on the Billboard Hot 100 and certified platinum. It was also a success in other countries, mostly charting within the top 10.

"Under the Bridge" helped the Red Hot Chili Peppers enter the mainstream. David Fricke of Rolling Stone said that the song "unexpectedly drop-kicked the band into the Top 10". The song has become an inspiration to other artists, and remains a seminal component of the alternative rock movement of the early and mid-1990s. In April 1998, English girl group All Saints released a cover of "Under the Bridge" that topped the UK Singles Chart for two weeks in May 1998.

Writing
During the production of the Red Hot Chili Peppers' 1991 album Blood Sugar Sex Magik, producer Rick Rubin regularly visited singer Anthony Kiedis to review his new material. He found a poem titled "Under the Bridge" in Kiedis's notebook and took an interest in the poignant lyrics. Rubin suggested that Kiedis show it to the rest of the band: "I thought it was beautiful. I said, 'We've got to do this.'"

Kiedis was reluctant, as he felt the poem was too emotional and did not fit the Chili Peppers' style. After singing the poem to guitarist John Frusciante and drummer Chad Smith, they "got up and walked over to their instruments and started finding the beat and guitar chords to match it". Frusciante chose the chords to balance the dark lyrics, saying "I thought if the lyrics are really sad like that I should write some chords that are happier".

Frusciante and Kiedis worked on the song for several days. It was one of the few tracks completed prior to the band moving into the Mansion, where they recorded the album. After the song was recorded, Rubin felt the grand ending would benefit from a large group of singers. Frusciante invited his mother, Gail, and her friend, both of whom sang in a choir, to perform.

Lyrics
Kiedis wrote many of the lyrics during a period of depression. After struggling with heroin and cocaine addiction, he had been sober for roughly three years. He felt that this had distanced him from his bandmates, who continued to use marijuana together; Kiedis felt that Frusciante was "no longer in [his] world". Driving home after rehearsal in April 1991, Kiedis thought of his addiction during his relationship with his former girlfriend Ione Skye. He wrote in his 2004 memoir Scar Tissue: "The loneliness that I was feeling triggered memories of my time with Ione and how I'd had this beautiful angel of a girl who was willing to give me all of her love, and instead of embracing that, I was downtown with fucking gangsters shooting speedballs under a bridge."

Kiedis's alienation led him to feel that the city of Los Angeles was his only companion, and that "there was a nonhuman entity, maybe the spirit of the hills and the city, who had me in her sights and was looking after me". The lines "Sometimes I feel like / My only friend / Is the city I live in / The City of Angels / Lonely as I am / Together we cry" link Kiedis's isolation and sense of susceptibility. However, he believed that his life was better without drugs. His optimism produced the chorus: "I don't ever want to feel / Like I did that day / Take me to the place I love", "the place" meaning his bandmates, friends, and family.

One verse discusses the harsh effects of drugs, their role in destroying Kiedis's relationships, and their impact on his happiness. The verse recounts his experience entering gang territory under a bridge to purchase drugs; to gain access, Kiedis pretended that a sister of one of the gang members was his fiancée. Kiedis wrote that this was one of his lowest moments, as it demonstrated the level to which he was willing to sink for his addiction.

Kiedis has refused to reveal the location of the bridge, saying only that it is in downtown Los Angeles. Using details provided by Kiedis in his autobiography, writer Mark Haskell Smith concluded that the bridge was in MacArthur Park; however, this contradicts Kiedis's assertion that the bridge was under a freeway. Other possible locations include the Belmont Tunnel about half a mile from MacArthur Park, and the overpass where Interstate Highway 10 (the Santa Monica Freeway) crosses Hoover Street close to downtown L.A.

Music

"Under the Bridge" is performed in 4/4 time in the key of E major. The intro changes between D and F major chords before the first verse moves into E. The bridge and ending modulate to A minor. The song marked a shift in style for Kiedis, who had spent most of his career singing rapidly due to his limited range. The song begins with Frusciante playing a slow introduction he said drew from the 1967 Jimi Hendrix song "Little Wing".

As Kiedis begins to sing, the guitar playing becomes more rapid until it reaches an E major seventh chord that halts the song; the silence is broken by drummer Chad Smith's closed hi-hat and cross stick struck at a fast tempo. Frusciante borrowed the E major seventh chord technique from British guitarist Marc Bolan of the glam rock band T. Rex, who used it in the song "Rip Off" from the 1971 album Electric Warrior.

"Under the Bridge" continues with another verse and chorus, when the bass enters. After the next verse an E major seven chord again marks a break before the start of the chorus. The second chorus transitions into a different verse, where Smith begins to play the drums, and Kiedis sings "Take me all the way/Yeah/Yeah-e-yeah/Oh no, no." After Kiedis cues "One time," a choir sings "Under the bridge downtown" and Kiedis sings "Is where I drew some blood/I could not get enough/Forgot about my love/I gave my life away" in between. As the choir, Kiedis and drums stop, Frusciante and Flea play the ending.

Release

Sales 
The first single from Blood Sugar Sex Magik was "Give It Away", which reached number one on the Billboard Modern Rock Tracks chart in late 1991. The band did not expect "Under the Bridge" to be as successful, but understood its commercial potential. Warner Bros. Records sent representatives to a Chili Peppers concert to determine which song should be the next single. When Frusciante began playing "Under the Bridge", Kiedis missed his cue and the audience began singing the song instead. Kiedis was initially "mortified that I had fucked up in front of Warner's people [...] I apologized for fucking up but they said 'Fucking up? Are you kidding me? When every single kid at the show sings a song, that's our next single'."

"Under the Bridge" was released on March 2, 1992. Journalist Jeff Apter noted that it "was the bona fide, across-all-formats radio hit that the band had been working towards for seven years". It spent 26 cumulative weeks on the United States Billboard Hot 100 chart. The single has been certified platinum by the Recording Industry Association of America.

Critical reception 
Parry Gettelman from Orlando Sentinel described the song as "an interesting Hendrix-Prince-Zep hybrid that has a lovely bass line (and none of Flea's increasingly predictable popping)." Nick Griffiths of Select dismissed it as "all mellow strumming and thoughtfully shallow vocals, though it's almost exonerated by a shrill unexpectedly choral middle eight". Reviewing the album, Ben DiPietro of the Richmond Times-Dispatch was impressed by the Chili Peppers' incorporation of slower tracks, especially "Under the Bridge". David Fricke of Rolling Stone said that it was a "stark and uncommonly pensive ballad" that "drop-kicked the band into the Top 10". Another editor, Tom Moon, felt that the song "revealed new dimensions. The rhythm section displays a growing curiosity about studio texture and nuance." 

Mark Frith from Smash Hits gave it five out of five, writing, "A classic. Far from being their usual in-yer-face energetic rap, "Under the Bridge" is a tender, thoughtful and quite sad tale of loneliness, the sort of thing that Pearl Jam would do if they forgot to ask their ten friends to play their guitars really loudly. Moody and brilliant." Philip Booth of The Tampa Tribune said it was "undulating [and] omnipresent" not only in alternative rock but pop music generally. According to Amy Hanson of AllMusic, it became "an integral part of the 1990s alterna-landscape, and remains one of the purest diamonds that sparkle amongst the rough-hewn and rich funk chasms that dominate the Peppers' own oeuvre". She praised "Under the Bridge" as a "poignant sentiment that is self evident among the simple guitar which cradles the introductory verse, and the sense of fragility that is only doubled by the still down-tempo choral crescendo".

"Under the Bridge" has been included in many publications' "Best of ..." lists. In 2002, Kerrang! placed the song at number six on their list of the "100 Greatest Singles of All Time". Q ranked the song number 180 on their compilation of the "1001 Best Songs, Ever". Life included "Under the Bridge" in the compilation "40 Years of Rock & Roll, 5 Songs Per Year 1952–1991", with the year being 1991. Pause and Play included the song in their unordered list of the "10 Songs of the 90's"; and the song ranked fifteenth in VH1's "100 Greatest Songs of the 90s". Rolling Stone and MTV compiled a list of the "100 Greatest Pop Songs Since The Beatles" in 2000, with "Under the Bridge" coming in fifty-fourth. "Under the Bridge" was also ranked #98 in the list of Rolling Stone "100 Greatest Guitar Songs of All Time" and ranked #328 on their "500 Greatest Songs of All Time".

"Under the Bridge" helped the Red Hot Chili Peppers enter the mainstream. David Fricke of Rolling Stone said that the song "unexpectedly drop-kicked the band into the Top 10", while Philip Booth of The Tampa Tribune commented that it was a "pretty, undulating, [and] by-now omnipresent single."

Music video

The accompanying music video for "Under the Bridge" was directed by Gus Van Sant, who photographed the band during their stay at the Mansion and provided the art direction for Blood Sugar Sex Magik. Van Sant knew Flea due to his role in Van Sant's 1991 film My Own Private Idaho. The band members respected Van Sant, and were elated when he agreed to direct the video for "Under the Bridge". Flea credited the video as "the thing that really made us break through the mainstream of American and worldwide pop culture".

The video was shot on the streets of Los Angeles and in a studio soundstage. It begins with Frusciante standing alone on a pedestal wearing a red-and-white-striped collared shirt, brown khaki pants, black and white wingtip shoes, and a purple, green and multicolored chullo, with white stitched wolves. He plays a 1966 Fender Jaguar behind the backdrop of a desert and an inverted cloudy sky. His shadow is projected either side of him. Frusciante's then-girlfriend, Toni Oswald, selected his clothes that day. Frusciante remembered Van Sant's surprise: "When I got [to the studio] Gus Van Sant was just looking at me and going 'God, I'm so glad you wore that hat. I'm so glad you wore that shirt. Oh! Those pants are so great, I'm so glad you wore those.'" The video marked a shift in Frusciante's on-camera behavior; he no longer wished to jump around fervently as in the band's prior videos.

As Kiedis begins to sing, he appears on camera bathed in purple light with blue fluorescent stars as a backdrop, surrounded by clouds. As the camera pans closer, an image of the skyline of Van Sant's home city, Portland, is superimposed from his chin downwards. Flea and Chad Smith are placed into the image while playing. Van Sant made superimposing the theme of the video; the idea came from a project he worked on with novelist William S. Burroughs.

The scenes in the studio are coupled with scenes of Kiedis walking the streets of L.A., wearing a white T-shirt with the words "To Hell And Back"; as he walks, the camera focuses on various people. At various points, Kiedis stands before the Belmont Tunnel before its closure, which he felt was vital; he felt that the studio portion alone would not convey enough emotion: "The first time we shot [the video] it was all in a studio and that didn't seem to capture everything we needed to capture. It needed more; it needed to be combined with an outdoor, streets-of-Los-Angeles thing." Towards the end, Kiedis runs down the Los Angeles River channel in slow motion; the background is a nuclear explosion (the "Baker" shot of Operation Crossroads). The video ends with various superimposed images of the band, followed by Frusciante playing alone on a pedestal—this time with an inverted shot of the ocean as the sky.

MTV placed the "Under the Bridge" video on heavy rotation. At the 1992 MTV Video Music Awards, the Red Hot Chili Peppers led the nominations, which included the categories of "Best Video", "Best Group", and "Best Direction". "Under the Bridge" won the group "Breakthrough Video" and "Viewers Choice Best Video"; the band's video for "Give It Away" won "Best Art Direction".  Chicago Tribune readers voted it the 8th best video of the year.

Live performances

"Under the Bridge" has been performed over 640 times since 1991, making it the Chili Peppers' second-most performed song behind "Give it Away". Unlike several of the Chili Peppers' other songs, "Under the Bridge" is not interpreted in a different manner than what is on the record—aside from being played acoustically, the track is performed the same as it appears on Blood Sugar Sex Magik. Kiedis is, however, notorious for being incapable of achieving several high notes in live performances; the vocalist has noted that he sometimes forgets or rearranges song lyrics in the verses. Therefore, the song has sometimes suffered from his limitations as a singer. After its release, the song would be included in virtually all concerts; Frusciante, however, began to resent the song's popularity and would play reflicted intros, purposefully throwing Kiedis off. An example of this was during a televised performance on the highly rated program Saturday Night Live on February 22, 1992. Kiedis said that it "felt like I was getting stabbed in the back and hung out to dry in front of all of America while [Frusciante] was off in a corner in the shadow, playing some dissonant out-of-tune experiment." Frusciante used a distortion pedal for the ending verse and screamed incomprehensibly into the microphone when providing backup vocals, neither of which were originally planned or typical of live performances. Nevertheless, sales of Blood Sugar Sex Magik skyrocketed following the show.

At times Kiedis has also resented singing the song, especially during instances when he felt distanced from the song's lyrics. In the past few years, however, Kiedis has experienced a revival in interest: "Although there have been times when I was over ['Under the Bridge'], I've rediscovered it and now I feel close to it and it still has power, and life, and purpose as a song." Frusciante believed that the flexibility of "Under the Bridge" has contributed to its success: "A lot of the time that is one of the ingredients of a hit; you can hear it over and over and it will still always mean new things, but you do go through cycles." Flea believes that the reason "Under the Bridge" had a recent revival in relevancy was due to Frusciante's first return to the band from 1998 to 2009 after quitting in 1992. Flea believed that it was vital to have the four members who wrote the track together.

"Under the Bridge" was played at the 1999 Woodstock Festival, which the Red Hot Chili Peppers headlined; they were the final act to perform. Attempts at distributing candles that were to be lit during the song backfired when the crowd, which was already disorderly, instead created a bonfire. Lighthearted foul-play escalated into violence when several women who had been crowd surfing and moshing were raped and nearby property was looted and destroyed. Other notable performances were at Slane Castle in August 2003 to 80,000 attendees; and in 2004 at London's Hyde Park, in which, over the course of three days, an estimated 250,000 people were in attendance. Released as the band's first live album, the event became the highest-grossing concert at a single venue in history, with a total revenue of $17.1 million. "Under the Bridge" is also performed on the Chili Peppers' concert video Off the Map released in 2001, and on an exclusive performance for iTunes in 2006. During the band's 2006 Stadium Arcadium World Tour, the band for the first time decided to drop the song from some of the setlists in favor of "I Could Have Lied" or "Soul to Squeeze". This continued on the band's 2016–17 The Getaway World Tour and 2022's Global Stadium Tour. On May 18, 2017, before playing "Under the Bridge" at a show in Indianapolis, Indiana, Flea said, "Love to Chris Cornell".  Chris Cornell had died after Soundgarden's concert the night before.

Track listings

 US cassette single (1992)
 "Under the Bridge" (album version) – 4:24
 "The Righteous & the Wicked" (album version) – 4:05

 UK 7-inch single (1992)
A. "Under the Bridge" (LP version) – 4:34
B. "Give It Away" (single mix) – 4:46

 UK 12-inch single (1992)
A1. "Under the Bridge" (LP version) – 4:34
A2. "Search and Destroy" – 3:39
B1. "Soul to Squeeze" – 4:50
B2. "Sikamikanico" – 3:25

 German CD single (1992)
 "Under the Bridge" (LP version) – 4:34
 "Sikamikanico" – 3:25
 "Give It Away" (12-inch mix) – 6:02
 "Give It Away" (Rasta Mix) – 6:47

 European 7-inch single (1992)
A. "Under the Bridge" – 4:34
B. "Sikamikanico" – 3:25

 UK limited-edition CD single (1994)
 "Under the Bridge" – 4:34
 "Sikamikanico" – 3:25
 "Suck My Kiss" (live) – 3:45
 "Search and Destroy" – 3:39

 UK maxi-single (1994)
 "Under the Bridge" – 4:24
 "Fela's Cock" – 5:10
 "I Could Have Lied" (live) – 4:33
 "Give It Away" (in progress) – 4:37

 UK limited-edition 7-inch blue vinyl (1994)
A. "Under the Bridge" – 4:34
B. "Suck My Kiss" (live) – 3:45

Personnel
Red Hot Chili Peppers
 Anthony Kiedis – vocals
 John Frusciante – guitar
 Flea – bass guitar
 Chad Smith – drums

Additional musicians
 Gail Frusciante and her friends – choir vocals
Brendan O'Brien - Hammond B-3 Organ

Charts

Weekly charts

Year-end charts

Decade-end charts

Certifications

All Saints version

"Under the Bridge" served as the third single released from English girl group All Saints' debut album, All Saints (1997). In the UK and Australia, it was issued as a double A-side with a cover of Labelle's "Lady Marmalade". It became All Saints' second number-one single on the UK Singles Chart.

Background
"Under the Bridge" was slightly altered because it contained personal lyrics by Anthony Kiedis, and the All Saints covered it because they liked the overall sound and feeling of the recording. The All Saints version contains samples of the original recording, the most important one being the distinctive guitar playing in the beginning. The Red Hot Chili Peppers were, however, displeased with this version; Kiedis felt the cover was poorly recreated and, because the final verse, which contains the line "Under the bridge downtown / is where I drew some blood", was omitted, it lost all personal significance. He said of All Saints' version: "It was kind of funny, they looked so pretty and clean, it looked like they didn't know what they were singing about". The guitar on "Under the Bridge" was played by Richard Hawley.

Music video
Both videos were shot as a set and cost £500,000 to make. The videos took four months of production before release. The girls chose to perform their own stunts in the video, and at one point Natalie Appleton was knocked over by an explosion, although she remained unhurt.

Track listings and formats

Personnel

Charts

Weekly charts

Year-end charts

Certifications

Other cover versions
"Under the Bridge" has been covered several times since its release in 1992. The song was first transcribed in 1994 by the a cappella group The Flying Pickets from their album The Original Flying Pickets: Volume 1. Notable jazz musician Frank Bennett covered the song by fusing elements of big bands and bebop in his 1996 album Five O'Clock Shadow. Hip hop artist Mos Def included the beginning verse of "Under the Bridge" in the song "Brooklyn," from his 1999 record Black on Both Sides. He, however, changed the line "the city I live in, the City of Angels", which refers to Los Angeles, to "the city I live in is beautiful Brooklyn," to match his song's premise. Tony Hadley covered the song on his 1995 album Obsession. Britain's Royal Philharmonic Orchestra has modified "Under the Bridge" at several concerts—they perform various rock pieces combined into a single orchestral ensemble, often including the Chili Peppers' hit.

Mike Patton's band Mr. Bungle performed a mock version of the song in 1999, as part of a halloween concert parodying Red Hot Chili Peppers. Patton had earlier covered snippets of it while in Faith No More during 1992 and 1993.

Alternative hip hop band Gym Class Heroes performed "Under the Bridge" on the 2006 assemblage Punk Goes '90s, an album that compiled popular rock songs from the 1990s being covered by contemporary artists. Gym Class Heroes continued to play "Under the Bridge" during their tour; lead singer Travis McCoy has said that it is "a timeless song. It's one of those songs you hear and are like 'Damn did this shit just come out?'" The All Saints version of "Under the Bridge", released in 1998, was the most successful cover version, reaching number one in the United Kingdom. The cover removed the final verse of the song that discusses drug use.  

The 1993 "Weird Al" Yankovic song "Bedrock Anthem", set in the world of The Flintstones, begins with a brief parody of "Under the Bridge", followed by a more extensive parody of "Give It Away". 

In 2008, Taylor Dayne released a cover version in her album Satisfied. 

In 2009, the Stanley Clarke Trio covered the song on the album Jazz in the Garden. John Craigie covers the song on his album Leave the Fire Behind.

References

Bibliography
 
 

1991 songs
1992 singles
1990s ballads
Red Hot Chili Peppers songs
Songs written by Anthony Kiedis
Songs written by Flea (musician)
Songs written by John Frusciante
Songs written by Chad Smith
Warner Records singles
Song recordings produced by Rick Rubin
Songs about Los Angeles
Songs about drugs
Songs about heroin
Songs about homelessness
Songs about loneliness
Number-one singles in Australia
UK Singles Chart number-one singles
1998 singles
All Saints (group) songs
The Flying Pickets songs
London Records singles
Trip hop songs
Songs based on poems
Alternative rock ballads